Swansea City Association Football Club, a Welsh association football club based in the city of Swansea, was founded in 1912 under the name of Swansea Town and joined the Second Division of the Southern Football League. Following the First World War, the Southern League dropped its Second Division, and with many clubs droppin out due to financial difficulties, Swansea were placed in the First Division. After four seasons in the Southern League, Swansea Town became founder members of the new Third Division of the Football League in 1920. During the club's 106-year existence, it has competed in a number of nationally and internationally organised competitions, and all players who have played in 100 or more such matches are listed below.

Roger Freestone holds the club record for most appearances in all competitions, having played 676 times in all competitions during two different spells spanning from 1989 to 2004. Wilfred Milne holds the record for the most league appearances, having made 583 appearances in his time at Swansea from 1920 to 1937. Ashley Williams holds the record for the number of international caps attained whilst playing for Swansea City. He represented Wales 64 times before he transferred to Everton in 2016.

The all-time goalscoring record is held by Ivor Allchurch. He scored 163 league goals, and 188 goals in all competitions during his two spells at Swansea. The nearest player that comes close to his tally, is Robbie James who scored 117 league goals in a Swansea career that began in 1972 and ended in 1990.

Key
The list is ordered first by number of appearances in total, then by number of League appearances, and then if necessary by date of debut.
Appearances as a substitute are included.
Statistics are correct up to and including the match played on 31 March 2018. Where a player left the club permanently after this date, his statistics are updated to his date of leaving.

Players with 100 or more appearances

Footnotes
<div style="font-size:95%">
Player statistics include games played while on loan from:

Player moved to Swansea permanently following a loan spell.

References
General
 
Soccerbase.com

Specific

Players
 
Swansea City A.F.C.
Association football player non-biographical articles